Quintessence is a Michelin 3-star Japanese French fusion restaurant in Shinagawa, Japan. It is difficult to reserve a table in the restaurant and has been listed as among the 50 best restaurants in Asia by CNN.

The head chef is Shuzo Kishida from Aichi Prefecture. Kishida worked for L'Astrance in Paris and studied French culinary arts.

In 2019, food from Quintessence was featured in the Japanese TV drama Grand Maison Tokyo. The production team of Grand Maison Tokyo consulted Chef Shuzo Kishida on the design of the menu items as seen being served in the titular restaurant in the drama.

See also
 List of French restaurants
 List of Michelin three starred restaurants

References

External links

Restaurants in Tokyo
Michelin Guide starred restaurants in Japan
French restaurants in Japan
Restaurants established in 2006
2006 establishments in Japan
Fusion cuisine